Discocerina is a genus of shore flies in the family Ephydridae.

Species

D. atrifacies Malloch, 1934
D. avanae Mathis & Zatwarnicki, 2010
D. biseta Meijere, 1916
D. buccatum (Cresson, 1930)
D. chalybea Hendel, 1930
D. communis Malloch, 1934
D. delmarva Mathis & Zatwarnicki, 2010
D. flavifrons Hendel, 1930
D. flavipes Cresson, 1941
D. juniori Mathis, 1997
D. mauritanica Vitte, 1991
D. mera Cresson, 1939
D. nadineae (Cresson, 1925)
D. nana Williston, 1896
D. nepos Cresson, 1918
D. obscura Williston, 1896
D. obscurella (Fallén, 1813)
D. peculiaris Miyagi, 1977
D. sana Cresson, 1931

References

Ephydridae
Diptera of North America
Diptera of South America
Diptera of Europe
Brachycera genera
Taxa named by Pierre-Justin-Marie Macquart